Mario Figueroa (born December 24, 1963) is a retired male professional road racing cyclist from Venezuela.

Career

1999
1st in Stage 1 Vuelta a Venezuela, Punto Fijo Circuito (VEN)
2000
1st in Stage 4 part b Vuelta a Venezuela, Valencia (VEN)
2001
1st in Sprints Classification Vuelta a Venezuela (VEN)

References
 
Venezuelan cyclists

1963 births
Living people
Venezuelan male cyclists
Vuelta a Venezuela stage winners
Place of birth missing (living people)